Leena Puranen Skogman (born 18 October 1986) is a Finnish football forward who plays for Swedish lower division team Varbergs BoIS. In 2012 and 2013 she played for Jitex BK in Sweden's Damallsvenskan. She previously played for FC Ilves, United Pietarsaari and HJK in the Naisten Liiga, and KIF Örebro and Hammarby IF in the Swedish league.

Puranen made her senior Finland women's national football team debut in a 4–0 friendly defeat by the United States in Carson, California on 25 August 2007. In May 2009 Puranen suffered an anterior cruciate ligament injury, which ruled her out of UEFA Women's Euro 2009 in Finland.

National coach Andrée Jeglertz selected Puranen in Finland's squad for UEFA Women's Euro 2013, but she did not play in any of their three games at the tournament.

When Jitex let several players go for financial reasons after the 2013 season, Puranen moved to Division 1 Kungsbacka DFF. By the mid season break she had scored 16 goals at the lower level.

References

External links
 
 Leena Puranen Skogman at Swedish Football Association (in Swedish)

1986 births
Living people
Finnish women's footballers
Finland women's international footballers
Expatriate women's footballers in Sweden
Jitex BK players
Damallsvenskan players
Hammarby Fotboll (women) players
KIF Örebro DFF players
Finnish expatriate footballers
Helsingin Jalkapalloklubi (women) players
Kansallinen Liiga players
FC United (Jakobstad) players
Women's association football wingers
Women's association football forwards
Kungsbacka DFF players
Footballers from Tampere